The Paydell was an English automobile manufactured from 1924 until 1925.  From Hendon, it was powered by a 13-9 hp Meadows four.

See also
 List of car manufacturers of the United Kingdom

References
David Burgess Wise, The New Illustrated Encyclopedia of Automobiles.

Defunct motor vehicle manufacturers of England
Motor vehicle manufacturers based in London